The Philippines competed at the 2013 Summer Universiade in Kazan, Russia from 6 to 17 July 2013. The Philippines sent 39 athletes.

The University Athletic Association of the Philippines  (UAAP), the organization which previously sent athletes to the Universiade prohibited athletes from its member schools to participate in the 2013 edition of the Universiade as well as tournaments organized by Federation of School Sports Association of the Philippines.

The Philippines won its first gold medal from GM Wesley So in chess.

Badminton

Men

Basketball

Men
The men's team participated at Group B. The Philippines was basically represented by the collegiate team University of the Visayas Green Lancers sans their two Cameroonian imports. The team won its right to represent the country by winning the National Students Basketball Championship, which was under the auspices of the Federation of School Sports Association of the Philippines
Team roster

|}
| style="vertical-align:top;" |
 Head coach
 Felix Belano Jr.
 Assistant coach
 Van Halen Parmis
 Team manager
 Gerald Anthony Gullas

Legend
(C) Team captain
Club – describes lastclub before the tournament
Age – describes ageon July 7, 2013
|}

Group B

|}

The Philippine national team was disqualified for leaving the tournament before the quarterfinal round. All five group stage games that the Philippines played were assigned 0-20 defeats as the result of the qualification. Have the Philippines played their quarterfinal match, they would have played against Ukraine.

The following matches were the scoreline of the Philippines prior to the team's disqualification.

Chess

Fencing

Swimming

Table Tennis

Tennis

Judo

Medalists

References

Nations at the 2013 Summer Universiade
Philippines at the Summer Universiade